Jean "Sinny" Sincere Zambello (August 16, 1919 – April 3, 2013) was an American film, television, theater and voice actress. Her credits included the films Roxanne, The Incredibles, and the musical television series, Glee.

Early life
Sincere was born on August 16, 1919, in Mount Vernon, New York.

Career 
In 1941, she debuted in her first Broadway performance in a production of Arsenic and Old Lace. Sincere joined the United Service Organizations (USO), entertaining American troops during World War II.

Sincere provided the voice for Mrs. Hogenson in the 2004 Pixar film, The Incredibles, directed by Brad Bird. She was cast in a recurring role as the Librarian in the FOX series, Glee, in 2010 and 2011. Her last role was in a guest appearance as Gloria on the Nickelodeon series, iCarly, in November 2012.

Personal life 
Sincere died from natural causes in Los Angeles, California, on April 3, 2013, at the age of 93. She had two children, director Francesca Zambello and art dealer Larry Zambello. Her late husband, Charles Carmine Zambello, whom she married in 1949, died in 1992. She was a Christian Scientist.

Filmography

Film

Television

References

External links
 

1919 births
2013 deaths
American film actresses
American television actresses
American stage actresses
American voice actresses
American Christian Scientists
Actors from Mount Vernon, New York
Actresses from New York (state)
20th-century American actresses
21st-century American actresses